Clássico dos Milhões (meaning "Derby of Millions") is the name of the soccer Brazilian derby between Flamengo and Vasco da Gama, both from the city of Rio de Janeiro. Considered as one of the most fiercely contested derbies in Brazilian football, both in historic rivalry and in popularity. It has been named that way since its beginnings in the 1920s, as Flamengo and Vasco have the two largest fan bases in the state of Rio de Janeiro.

Poll estimations, though variable, attribute Flamengo and Vasco with a combined share of about 20% of the overall population, i.e., totaling around 45 million supporters nationwide (roughly 30 million to Flamengo and 15 million to Vasco). At local Rio state level, polls suggest that both clubs account for more than two quarters of the declared supporter base (typically 50% of the overall Rio State population for Flamengo, 19% for Vasco, 15% for Fluminense and 12% for Botafogo, because Vasco and Botafogo have more supporters outside their home state).

Its intense rivalry, though more stressed in football since 1923 when Vasco rose to first division, started already in the first decades in rowing regatte, as both clubs were founded in the late 19th century (Vasco 1898 and Flamengo 1895) as rowing clubs. Both teams also compete often at national level in other sports such as basketball, swimming, futsal and judo.

Early days
Since its first year, it capitalized on the already-existing rivalry in rowing. But it took a whole new scale as football opened to the masses.

Flamengo has had in 99 years an overall edge in teams of direct matches but also titles and direct decisions. In state league, it has won 37 titles against 24 to Vasco, since 1923 when both teams staged, Flamengo has won 33 titles (plus one Special as Rio State and Rio City merged in 1979) against 24 to Vasco.

1958 and the "Super-super-championship" 
At a time when both clubs were already known for their mass appeal, but the rivalry still missed some anthologic matches, this championship was considered unique as twice Botafogo, Flamengo and Vasco had to play a tie-break triangular. The final match finally was disputed by Vasco and Flamengo, the latter playing for a draw which was eventually obtained, in front of a record crowd. This championship would though sign a drought period of 12 years for Vasco, which helped to promote other derbies like Flamengo x Botafogo and as ever Flamengo x Fluminense as challengers throughout the 1960s.

The 1972–2001 period
This period can be singled out as the one that established the derby's reputation as the top one in Rio and eventually in Brazil, definitely surpassing its Fla-Flu rival both on the field and off it. In the span of 30 years, at least one of the teams managed to reach every final phase of the Rio state league. It also corresponds barely to the creation of the Brazilian national championship (1971), which displayed the popularity of both teams across the country, particularly in northern/northeastern states (but also southern states such as Santa Catarina), where often they constitute the main fanbase in front of local teams.

Rio state level
Given the once-traditional structure of Rio state league divided in "turno" and "returno" (home and away season) occasionally complemented by a shorter third "turno" with the top overall teams, Vasco and Flamengo have clinched 50 out of the 68 turnos (25 each). In 4 occasions an extra play-off between both teams was needed to decide the turno. In 9 occasions the derby was the last-round decisive game for both teams.

The first "turno" of Rio state league is given an extra importance as dubbed the "Taça Guanabara", incorporating a previously traditional competition only from the inner-city clubs.  Flamengo clinched it 13 times and Vasco 9 in this period.

They also participated together in a final phase (be it direct decision, triangular, quadrangular or semi-final) in 17 occasions out of 24 (in 6 occasions no final phase was needed as one team would win all turnos – this occurred 3 times for Vasco in 1977, 1992 and 1998 and also to Flamengo in 1978, 1979 and 1996).

Flamengo at the end clinched 11 titles in that period against 8 from Vasco. This in particular stems from a three-in-a-row win (see below) in the last years (1999–2001). Fluminense also clinched 8 titles, proving despite it much lower presence a greater efficiency (out of only 11 turno wins).

 A: América
 B: Bangu
 F: Botafogo
 M: Flamengo
 N: Fluminense
 V: Vasco

National level
Though less frequent given the overall balance of national clubs and its scattered group structure, both teams met decisively 3 times in final phase, but never the finals: in 1983 in quarterfinal playoffs (Flamengo had the edge), and 1992 and 1997 in semi-final phase (Flamengo had the edge on the first but the derby was no ultimate decider as played two rounds before round-robin end, while Vasco had the edge in the latter in a famous 4–1 decider). Most notably, in each occasion the winner of the derby eventually clinched the title. Both teams in the 1971–2000 period ranked in the top 6 of the tournaments (Vasco #1 and Flamengo #6) and feature each among the few clubs (alongside Palmeiras and Corinthians) to have clinched more than 4 Brazilian titles since its inception in 1971 (Flamengo had won 5 titles by then against Vasco da Gama's 4).

In Brazilian Cup, though less prestigious, both teams were scheduled to meet in finals in July, 2006. It was Flamengo's 5th final and Vasco's first. Flamengo eventually clinched its second Cup title ever. The competition though did not count with the participation of the top 5 Brazilian championship teams as they participated the Libertadores Cup, but in relative terms it was for the derby's history one of the most important ever.

Zico vs Roberto "Dinamite"
During the period above, the rivalry was personified in both players, still today considered the two most important players of each club ever. They played for about the same time lapse: though Roberto (or simply, Dinamite, after its powerful shot, a nickname given to him at the time he scored his first goal as a professional in 1972) started playing earlier, both reached early stardom around 1974 (when Vasco reached its first national title) and continued until the late 1980s. Both players crystallized the style of play, Zico embodying the more technical, refined Flamengo of the 1980s and Roberto the attacking, never-say-die style of Vasco at the time.  It can be said that the first tests between both started in the play-offs of 1976 Taça Guanabara, where Zico missed a penalty kick to award Vasco the title. The same occurred a year later, to give Vasco the overall title. Later on, Flamengo had a clear edge as it swept all turnos of 78 and 79 (including the 79 Special championship). In the early 1980s, Vasco saw Flamengo raise to its three national titles then but still consistently gave a run for the money of their arch-rivals (as in the 1980 finals). After a long runner-up series to either the Flamengo and Fluminense from 1978 through 1981, they eventually defeated the brilliant world-champ Flamengo side in 1982 to recoup the Carioca title. Both players always displayed enormous respect for their opponents and somehow were constantly admired by the other side, most supporters secretly hoping that one day each one could turn sides and play for their club. Vasco supporters still pride the day Zico wore their jersey in a friendly for Dinamite's retirement.

Tita and Bebeto
After the Zico & Roberto phase, both teams experienced a transition period, though still maintaining a high standard. In that period some important players change sides, raising some passionate discussions. First Tita had been discovered by Flamengo but later on joined Vasco, only to score the winning goal in the 1987 Carioca final in Vasco's 1–0 victory. Also Bebeto followed the same path and offered Vasco brilliant participation in the 1989 Brazilian league, before going north and eventually clinching the 1994 World Cup with Romário.

1988
In this year, the two teams decided the title in direct play-offs for the third time in a row. Flamengo had clinched the 1986 title and Vasco the 1987 one, so 1988 would decide the best-of-three. Vasco confirmed its status as favorite and won the last game 1–0 while playing for a draw. The winning goal though only came with 1 minute left to play and was scored by an unknown player who came on as a substitute a few minutes before, nicknamed Cocada (after a popular coconut sweet), only to be sent off for provocative celebration. On the day after, Vasco supporters would tease their rivals by offering them cocadas.

Romário
Romário alone eschewed this rivalry, displaying ambiguous positions regarding his support. More recently he declared supporting neither club, but rather América, a small and formerly prestigious club of Rio. Tough Romário was discovered by Vasco and started as a professional in 1986, clinching the 1987 title before going north, he later decided to join Flamengo in 1995 when returning to Brazil, much to Vasco supporters' outrage. Despite this betrayal, he still managed to be hired by Vasco in the late 1990s. He was somewhat forgiven as he would still clinch its fourth Brazilian title in 2000 and Mercosul cup in 2001. This contrasts with the almost blank record playing with Flamengo except for the Carioca title of 1996. He also twice succeeded as top striker of the Brazilian championship, the last as recently as 2005, at age 40. He expressed the desire of retiring by playing half time with the jerseys of each team.

2001
Flamengo and Vasco had displayed very balanced statistics in the latter decades, with a very slight advantage though to Flamengo specially in direct decisive confrontations.  This had from time to time allowed Flamengo supporters to call their arch-rivals as "freguês" (i.e. customer) and tease them as consistent "vice" (runners-up), especially during the time of the great Flamengo side of the early 1980s.  But Vasco eventually reverted this as in the late 1980s and early 1990s, when it clinched its first tri-campeonato (three championships in a row, a rare feat). By the time of the late 1990s, Vasco could even claim to be the major Carioca winner since 1923, ahead of Flamengo and Fluminense. This "freguês" (similar to Boca vs River) teasing returned in early 2001 as Flamengo clinched another "tri-campeonato", with all three titles being won directly over Vasco, and largely contributing to the recent imbalance in statistics. Ironically, these wins of Flamengo at state league level were obtained at arguably the best period ever of Vasco's history, during which it clinched two Brazilian titles and two South American titles. In each final from 1998 through 2001, Flamengo was rated as the underdog. The title of the "tri" came in a specially dramatic way, as Vasco played the last game with a one-goal cushion advantage and saw Flamengo score 3 x 1 with few minutes to play. It was for Flamengo fans a compensation for the series of humiliating defeats (among which two 5 x 1) imposed by the brilliant Vasco side of the time.

After 2001
Since 2001 when Flamengo clinched the tri and Vasco the Mercosur Cup, both teams have been plagued by financial problems and have simultaneously reached an unprecedented decadence, struggling to avoid the same spots of relegation to Brazilian second division. Vasco (2003) and Flamengo (2004 – over Vasco, again) still won since one state league title each. In their seemingly atavistic manner of crossing in each other's way, both teams recently managed to reach the finals of Brazilian Cup scheduled for July 2006.

2006
In a painful re-run of the early 1980s for Vasco supporters, Flamengo managed in July 2006 to win its fifth decision in a row in recent years. Though the previous ones could maybe have been minimized as local State leagues as Vasco then fought for Brazilian and South American titles, this time it was the first ever decision between both teams at national level. By the same way Flamengo clinched its second Brazilian Cup title against one to Vasco.

2009 – 2011
As new economic bright times shine for Brazil, new sponsors and investments have also shaped strengthening the Classico dos Milhões with bigger payrolls on both sides, once again putting Rio football into the limelight of dominating the Brazilian scene. Vasco dropped to the Campeonato Brasileiro Série B in 2008 following a disastrous turn of power in the club with longtime president Eurico Miranda being ousted and Roberto Dinamite stepping in, whilst having lost both games to Flamengo. In the 2009 Carioca State League, the first match between the clubs following Vasco's relegation to Série B, Vasco beat Flamengo 2–0, however the Red-and-blacks went on to clinch the title, the third in a row. 
In that same year Flamengo, led by the Petkvovic and Adriano duo, managed an incredible run in the end of the year to win the Série A for the fifth time (their sixth title overall), following a 17 years-long drought.
Meanwhile, in the second tier, Vasco got promoted by easily winning the Série B title.

2010 began full of hopes for the Red-and-Black Nação. With the arrival of striker Vagner Love, the defending Brazilian Champions dreamt of a good run in the 2010 Copa Libertadores. A rough start made them finish second in their group, and 16th overall. In the Round of 16, a 1–0 win at home and a 2–1 defeat away in the face-off against 1st placed Corinthians made the Gávea club advance thanks to the away goals rule. In the very next phase, Flamengo tasted their own medicine, when Chilean champions Universidad de Chile (who topped Flamengo's group earlier) advanced to the semi-finals making use of the same away goals rule after a 3-3 aggregate result.
Following the Libertadores elimination and a second-place finish in the Carioca League, an exodus plagued Flamengo. Home-grown and star-of-the-company Adriano left for AS Roma, while Vágner Love went back to CSKA Moscow.

In the Brasileirão, a fight against relegation began and what was once seen as the first year of a dynasty quickly turned into a nightmare. A constant change of head coaches, something frequent in Brazilian football, made things worse. Even though the team never actually entered the bottom four, a disastrous run of only 9 wins in 38 games made Flamengo fight at the lower end of the table the whole year. And with a 'help' from the fixtures (16th-placed Atlético Goianiense and 17th-placed Vitória faced each other in the last game, meaning guaranteed salvation for Flamengo) the Vanderlei Luxemburgo-led squad stayed in the first tier, finishing 14th.
Recently promoted Vasco had a slightly better season, finishing 11th. 
With both matches in the Campeonatio Brasileiro Serie A having ended in draws, 0–0 and 1–1, whilst the encounters in the Campeonato carioca turned in favour of Flamengo, is easy to say both teams failed to achieve any sort of success that year.

In 2011, both clubs would see better times. 
Flamengo, who had seen 2009 Champions and fan-favourites Serbian midfielder Petkovic retire at the end of 2010 and left-back Juan leave for São Paulo, brought in new star players for their squad. Thiago Neves arrived at the beginning of the season along with goalkeeper Felipe and Argentine midfielder Dario Bottinelli, Ronaldinho Gaúcho followed right after. The team also had players such as Léo Moura, Ronaldo Angelim, Renato and Deivid. 
Vasco da Gama also considerably better their team for the season, with the arrivals of club idols Felipe and Juninho, midfielder Diego Souza (who had previously played for two Vasco's rivals Fluminense and Flamengo) and striker Alecsandro, along with players such as Fernando Prass, Dedé, Fagner, Éder Luis, Rômulo and Élton.
The year would start better for the Vultures, who beat Vasco in the Taça Rio final after a penalty shootout and went on to win their 32nd Campeonato Carioca title, this time unbeaten. This defeatless run would last until the Copa do Brasil quarterfinals, when Flamengo lost 2–1 to Ceará and got eliminated. This also culminated in a 10 winless run in the Campeonato Brasileiro, ultimately pushing Flamengo out of title contention.
The Cruzmaltino however, had a much better season overall. The return of Juninho quickly proved to be a turning point for the club, bringing them to a very high level of football. 
After a 1–0 home victory in the first leg of the final against Coritiba and a 3–2 away defeat in the second, the away goals rule gave Vasco the Copa do Brasil title on June 8. Fighting for the Série A title until the end, Vasco would finish second to Corinthians after a 1-1 Clássico dos Milhões draw on the final day.

2013 - The beginning of Vasco's dark times, and a new light for Flamengo
After losing Ronaldinho and Thiago Neves, and only managing a midtable finish in 2012, Flamengo started 2013 with a new president. Eduardo Bandeira de Mello was elected for a 3-year tenure, replacing Patrícia Amorim. 
With the objective of paying up all the club's debts (which at the time were closing in to 1 billion Reais), the Bandeira era started with a more modest squad. Vágner Love, who had come back the previous year, was returned to CSKA Moscow once again. Coach Dorival Júnior was released due to high salaries, and Mano Menezes was brought in. After a 4–2 defeat for Athletico Paranaense at the Maracanã, in which the team opened up 2-0 and got 4 goals past them in the second half, along with a bad season up to that point made the ex-Seleção manager quit the job during a post-game press conference. For his place, assistant coach Jayme de Almeida was selected, and the fans expected another relegation fight.

The team, led by loanee midfielder Elias and striker Hernane 'Brocador', clinched the club's third Copa do Brasil title, beating the same Athletico Paranaense 3–1 in the final (1-1 away and 2–0 at home). This run is remembered by the fans due to a late winner from Elias against Cruzeiro in the Round of 16, and a 4-0 smashing of crosstown rivals Botafogo in the quarter-finals.

In the other side of town Vasco, who had a great 2012 season, finishing 5th in Série A and reaching the Copa Libertadores quarter-finals, would get relegated once again. Many of the fan-favourites left the club, including goalkeeper Fernando Prass went to play for Palmeiras in the second division, Dedé who left for Cruzeiro, club legend Felipe switched sides to rival club Fluminense, and Juninho who signed for the New York Red Bulls. That way, all the 2011 CdB winning squad was out of São Januário.
A melencolic season started, and a 5–1 defeat in the final day sealed the Admirals second ever descent to Série B.

Flamengo's Eternal Glory and Vasco's 5th Série B
The 2013's relegation and only a 3rd-place finish in 2014 meant a lot of changes in Vasco. Eurico Miranda returned as the president once more, Nenê and Dagoberto were brought in along with 29 other players. A Umbro contract and back-to-back Carioca titles did not help Vasco who, after just one season back in the top flight, were relegated once more. The Olympic year of 2016 saw the Gigante da Colina struggle to finish 3rd in the Série B again.

In 2017, however, things got a little better. Vasco managed a spot in the 2018 Copa Libertadores qualifying stage following a 7th-place finish in Série A, one place below Flamengo who finished 6th.

Drowning in debt, and with the passing of president Eurico Miranda, Vasco's newfound 'luck' wouldn't last very long. Back-to-back polemic filled elections, a constant fight for power inside the club, many coach sackings, hundreds of players coming and going and a pandemic couldn't result in anything else but yet another relegation. At the end of the 2020 season, Vasco descended to Série B for the fourth time in their history, this time with the company of rivals Botafogo.
However, 2021 would be even worse. In what was called "The Super Serie B" due to the high number of first tier champions participating, Vasco would struggle from the start. Even with the return of the now 40-year-old Nenê and the hiring of rising-star coach Fernando Diniz, Vasco had their worst season ever, losing any chances of promotion following a 4–0 home defeat to Botafogo, a game in which they could've got a historic beating if the Alvinegros hadn't decided to respect their rivals (as was revealed by Botafogo's manager Enderson Moreira after the match).
Vasco da Gama will play their 5th Série B, the second in a row, in 2022.

After the 2013 Copa do Brasil title, Flamengo would consistently increase their squad and performance in the following years. Being the club with the biggest fan-base in the Americas, paying the astronomical debt was not as hard as the past presidents made it out to be. Having a surplus of money for the first time in decades, Flamengo started to bring in new stars for the team.
The first one to be signed was Peru international and ex-Corinthians striker Paolo Guerrero. The next year, 2016, an old dream of the Nação arrived in Rio de Janeiro, midfielder Diego Ribas. Éverton Ribeiro, Diego Alves, Vitinho, Gabigol, Bruno Henrique, De Arrascaeta, Gérson, Filipe Luis and Rafinha would come in the following years.
After three years fighting for the top spots in the Brasileirão, but with disappointing performances in the Libertadores, 2019 came along to change the club's history.
An excursion to the US in the beginning of the year, where Flamengo faced Ajax and Eintracht Frankfurt, would be the starting point of what was to come.

Qualifying to the Libertadores Round of 16 for only the second time in ten years gave confidence to the fans, and with the arrival of Portuguese manager Jorge Jesus and a few other reinforcements the team got even stronger. A rocky start (which included a Copa do Brasil elimination) didn't shake the selefla and with almost every record being broken in Série A and a 5–0 victory against Grêmio in the semis, Flamengo reached the Libertadores final for only the second time in history.
The final against River Plate started with the Argentine side scoring early, but the "Magic Trio" of Bruno Henrique, Arrascaeta and Gabigol turned things around in the most Flamengo way possible. Scoring twice, in the 89th and the 92nd minutes, Gabigol gave the second continental title to Mengão.

The very next day, while in a parade commemorating the title, Flamengo went on to win the Série A with five games to go, thanks to a Grêmio away victory over second placed Palmeiras.
Even though Jesus left during the pandemic, Flamengo would manage to be champions of Brazil again in 2020, and reach another Libertadores final in 2021.

Overall Statistics

Summary of results 

First meeting
 Flamengo 1–0 Vasco, March 26, 1922, Estádio das Laranjeiras, Torneio Início 1922

Latest meetings
 Flamengo 1-0 Vasco, March 20, 2022, Maracanã, Campeonato Carioca - Semi-Final, Second Leg
 Vasco 0-1 Flamengo, March 16, 2022, Maracanã, Campeonato Carioca - Semi-Final, First Leg
 Flamengo 2–1 Vasco, March 6, 2022, Engenhão, Campeonato Carioca

Largest victories by team
 Vasco 7–0 Flamengo, April 26, 1931, Campeonato Carioca
 Flamengo 6–2 Vasco, October 3, 1943, Campeonato Carioca

Titles comparison

(1): Other State Trophies include: Copa Rio, Taça Guanabara Independente, Torneio Extra, Torneio Relâmpago, Torneio Início, Torneio Aberto and Campeonato Carioca Série B.

List of decisive games
Arguably the first decision ever between both teams ever started in 1944, more than twenty years after their accession to first division, when Flamengo played Vasco in last round to clinch its first ever three-in-a-row title. Between then and 1972, only one decisive game was played in 1958 in the uniquely named super-super-championship as twice Vasco, Flamengo and Botafogo had to play a tie-break triangular.
 1944 – Last round decisive (Flamengo 1–0)
 1958 – Last round decisive (Flamengo 3–1)
 1958 – Final tie-break triangular (super) – 1st-round (Vasco 2–0)
 1958 – Final tie-break triangular (super-super) – last-round decisive (Vasco 1–1)
 1972 – Final triangular – 1st round (Flamengo 1–0)
 1973 – Taça Guanabara (1st turno) – last-round decisive – (Flamengo 1–0)
 1973 – Semi-final play-off – decisive (Flamengo 0–0)
 1974 – Final triangular – last-round decisive (Flamengo 0–0)
 1975 – 3rd turno extra tie-break play-off (Vasco 1–0)
 1976 – Taça Guanabara extra tie-break play-off (Vasco 1–1, 5–4 on p.s.)
 1977 – 2nd turno extra tie-break play-off (Vasco 0–0, 5–4 on p.s.)
 1978 – 2nd turno – last round decisive (Flamengo 1–0)
 1979 – Final octagonal – decisive (Flamengo 3–2)
 1981 – Final play-offs (3 matches: Flamengo 0–2, 0–1 and 2–1)
 1982 – Taça Guanabara extra tie-break play-off (Flamengo 1–0)
 1982 – Final triangular – last-round decisive (Vasco 1–0)
 1983 – Campeonato Brasileiro – quarter-finals (Flamengo 2–1, 1–1)
 1984 – Final triangular – 2nd round (Flamengo 1–0)
 1986 – Taça Guanabara – last-round decisive (Vasco 2–0)
 1986 – Final play-offs (3 matches: Flamengo 0–0, 0–0, 2–0)
 1987 – Final triangular – last-round decisive (Vasco 1–0)
 1988 – 3rd turno quadrangular – last-round decisive (Vasco 3–1)
 1988 – Final play-offs (2 matches: Vasco 2–1, 1–0)
 1989 – Taça Guanabara – last-round decisive to Flamengo only (Flamengo 3–1)
 1989 – Taça Rio (2nd turno) – last-round decisive to Flamengo only (Vasco 2–1)
 1992 – Taça Guanabara – last-round decisive (Vasco 1–1)
 1992 – Campeonato Brasileiro – semi-final quadrangular (Flamengo 1–1, 2–0)
 1994 – Final quadrangular – (2 matches : Vasco 1–2, 1–1)
 1996 – Taça Guanabara – last-round decisive (Flamengo 2–0)
 1996 – Taça Rio – last-round decisive (Flamengo 0–0)
 1997 – Taça Rio – decisive to Vasco only (Vasco 1–0 by WO)
*1997 – Campeonato Brasileiro – semi-final quadrangular (Vasco 1–1, 4–1)
 1998 – Taça Guanabara – last-round decisive (Vasco 2–0 by WO)
 1999 – Taça Guanabara – last-round decisive (Flamengo 2–0)
 1999 – Taça Rio – last-round decisive (Vasco 2–0)
 1999 – Final play-offs (2 matches: Flamengo 1–1, 1–0)
 2000 – Final play-offs (2 matches: Flamengo 3–0, 2–1)
 2001 – Taça Guanabara – semi-final play-off (Flamengo 1–0)
 2001 – Final play-offs (2 matches: Flamengo 1–2, 3–1)
 2003 – Taça Guanabara – last-round decisive (Vasco 1–1)
 2004 – Taça Guanabara – semifinals (Flamengo 2–0)
 2004 – Taça Rio – last-round decisive to Vasco only (Vasco 2–1)
 2004 – Final play-offs (2 matches: Flamengo 2–1, 3–1)
 2006 – Copa do Brasil – final play-offs (Flamengo 2–0, 1–0)
 2007 – Taça Guanabara Semi-Final (Flamengo 3–1 penalty kicks after 1–1 in the normal time)
 2008 – Taça Guanabara Semi-Final (Flamengo 2–1)
 2010 – Taça Rio Semi-Final (Flamengo 2–1)
 2011 – Final play-offs (Flamengo 3–1 penalty kicks after 0–0 in the normal time)
 2012 – Taça Guanabara Semi-Final (Vasco 2–1)
 2004 – Taça Rio - penultimate-round decisive to Flamengo only (Flamengo 2–1)
 2012 – Taça Rio Semi-Final (Vasco 3–2)
 2014 – Final play-offs (2 matches: Flamengo 1–1, 1–1)
 2015 – Semi-Final (2 matches: Vasco 0–0, 1–0)
 2015 – Copa do Brasil – Quarterfinals (Vasco 1–0, 1–1)
 2016 – Semi-Final (Vasco 2–0)
 2017 – Taça Guanabara Semi-Final (Flamengo 1–0)
 2015 – Semi-Final (Flamengo 0–0)
 2019 – Taça Rio Final (Flamengo 3–1 penalty kicks after 1–1 in the normal time)
 2019 – Final play-offs (2 matches: Flamengo 2–0, 2–0)
 2022 – Taça Guanabara - This game secured Flamengo's tie advantage in the semifinals (Flamengo 2–1)
 2022 – Semi-Final (2 matches: Flamengo 1–0, 1–0)

Other notable matches
 1975 – 3rd turno – Vasco 3 x 2 Flamengo – This game arguably triggered Vasco's most enduring reputation, dubbed "o time da virada" (i.e., the turnaround team), after its never-say-die attitude which led to many remounting scores (others may say never-win-easy instead). After this win (after trailing 0x2, a remounting that never occurred again between the two clubs), Vasco would win a series of derbies by remounting to clinch the turno, and the press labeled "Vascão vira-vira" (meaning roughly Big Vasco bottom-up). Since then, its supporters incorporated this feature in their songs ("the team of tournaround and love"). An epic 4x3 away win over Palmeiras in Mercosur Cup finals in 2001 after trailing 0x3, among others less notable in-between, recently sustained this reputation.
 2000 – Taça Guanabara – Vasco 5 x 1 Flamengo – Dubbed since by Vasco supporters "o chocolate da Páscoa" (i.e., Easter chocolate, after the Rio's football slang "chocolate" for a big win and as the game was played on Easter). Vasco confirmed the clinching of the turn title.

Related works

Books
 Flamengo x Vasco – o clássico, ASSAF/MARTINS 1999, Editora Relume Dumará –

Videos
 Duels de légende /vol.2 Flamengo – Vasco da Gama, Rod Hay 2005, WARNER VISION FRANCE

References

Brazilian football derbies
CR Flamengo
CR Vasco da Gama